Chinese Whispers may refer to:

Chinese whispers, a game in which a line of players whispers a message from one to another

Books
Chinese Whispers (novella), a 1987 novella by Maurice Leitch
Chinese Whispers (Ashbery book), a 2002 poetry collection by John Ashbery
Chinese Whispers: The True Story Behind Britain's Hidden Army of Labour, a 2008 book by Hsiao-Hung Pai

Television
 Chinese Whispers (1989 film), a 1989 British television film dramatisation of the novella by Maurice Leitch in the anthology series ScreenPlay

Music
Chinese Whispers (Waterhouse), a 2010 composition for string quartet by Graham Waterhouse
"Chinese Whispers", a 1983 song by Yellow Magic Orchestra from Service
"Chinese Whispers", a 1985 song by The Alan Parsons Project from Stereotomy
"Chinese Whispers", a 1987 song by Go West from Dancing on the Couch
"Chinese Whispers", a 1989 song by New Model Army from Thunder and Consolation
"Chinese Whispers", a 1993 song by Creepmime
Chinese Whispers, a 1997 album by Greg Johnson
"Chinese Whispers", a 1997 song by Alchemist from Spiritech
Chinese Whispers, a 2000 album by Full Flava
"Chinese Whispers", a 2001 song by Scooter from We Bring the Noise!
"Chinese Whispers", a 2002 song by The Future Sound of London/Amorphous Androgynous from The Isness
"Chinese Whispers", a 2004 song by Angel from Believe in Angels... Believe in Me
"Chinese Whispers", a 2008 song by Brett Anderson from Wilderness
"Chinese Whispers, a 2008 song by Jessica Mauboy from Been Waiting
"Chinese Whispers", a 2009 song by Tinpan Orange from The Bottom of the Lake
"Chinese Whispers", a 2010 song by The Dillinger Escape Plan from Option Paralysis

Other uses
Chinese whispers (clustering method), in network science